The men's barefoot three event competition in water skiing at the 2001 World Games took place from 23 to 25 August 2001 at the Ogata Water Ski Course in Ogata, Akita, Japan.

Competition format
A total of 12 athletes entered the competition. In this competition athletes compete in three events: slalom, tricks and jump. Best five athletes from preliminary round qualifies to the final.

Results

Preliminary

Finals

Slalom

Tricks

Jump

Overall

References

External links
 Results on IWGA website

Water skiing at the 2001 World Games